Radical 120 or radical silk meaning "silk" is one of the 29 Kangxi radicals (214 radicals in total) composed of 6 strokes.

In the Kangxi Dictionary, there are 823 characters (out of 49,030) to be found under this radical.

Evolution

Derived characters

 (the simplified form of ) falls under radical 1.

Variant forms

This radical character takes different forms in different languages and characters.

In traditional typefaces, regardless of the position of the radical character, the two turning strokes are broken into two respectively to adapt to the carving of movable type systems, and there is usually a gap between the second and the third strokes, and the middle stroke of the last three strokes is a vertical line and is written prior to the rest two strokes (middle-left-right). In actual handwriting, however, when the radical character is used as a left component, the last three strokes are more often written as dots from left to right rather than middle-left-right, especially in regular script. 

The standard printing form of the traditional left component form  is also altered to imitate the handwriting form, and the last three strokes are also written left-to-right. In addition, in mainland China's Guo Biao traditional Chinese characters, the first dot in the last three strokes of  tilts to the left, while in Taiwan's Standard Form of National Characters, all three dots are written rightward. The more traditional typeface form  is still widely used in Traditional Chinese publication

The traditional form remains standard in modern Japanese and Korean printing typefaces, while in handwriting, both forms are acceptable.

Literature

External links

Unihan Database - U+7CF8

120
148